Yu Liqiao (born 26 November 1957) is a Chinese tennis coach and former player. She was an early coach of Li Na.

Yu played for the China Federation Cup team from 1981 to 1983, winning five singles rubbers. She also represented China at the Asian Games and was a singles bronze medalist in 1982.

Her performances on the WTA Tour include a doubles title at the 1979 Borden Classic and a run to the singles quarter-finals of the Japan Open in 1980, beating fifth seed Renáta Tomanová en route.

WTA Tour finals

Doubles (1–1)

References

External links
 
 
 

1957 births
Living people
Chinese female tennis players
Asian Games medalists in tennis
Asian Games silver medalists for China
Asian Games bronze medalists for China
Medalists at the 1978 Asian Games
Medalists at the 1982 Asian Games
Tennis players at the 1978 Asian Games
Tennis players at the 1982 Asian Games
21st-century Chinese women